Hieronymus Karl Graf von Colloredo-Mansfeld (30 March 1775 – 23 July 1822) was an Austrian corps commander during the Napoleonic Wars.

Early life 
Hieronymus Josef Johann Franz Quirinus was born as the younger son of Prince Franz Gundackar I von Colloredo-Mansfeld (1731-1807) and his wife, Countess Anna Maria Isabella von Mansfeld-Vorderort (1750-1794).

Career 
During his military career, he played an important part in the German campaign of 1813, which contributed decisively to the coalition victory at the battle of Kulm.

Marriage and issue 

He was married to Countess Wilhelmina Johanna von Waldstein-Wartenberg (1775-1840), daughter of Count Georg Christian von Waldstein-Wartenberg (1743-1791) and his wife, Countess Elisabeth Maria von Ulfeldt 91747-1791). They had one son and a daughter:
 Prince Franz de Paula Gundaker von Colloredo-Mannsfeld (1802-1852); married Countess Christine von Clam-Gallas and had issue.
 Countess Wilhelmina Maria Elisabeth Johanna Baptista (1804-1871); married Prince Rudolf Kinsky von Wchinitz und Tettau and had issue.

See also
Colloredo-Mannsfeld

References and notes

1775 births
1822 deaths
Counts of Austria
Hieronymus Karl
Generals of the Holy Roman Empire
Austrian Empire commanders of the Napoleonic Wars
Commanders Cross of the Military Order of Maria Theresa